The Taiwan bamboo partridge (Bambusicola sonorivox) is a species of bird in the family Phasianidae. It is endemic to Taiwan.  It was formerly considered a subspecies of the Chinese bamboo partridge.

It has several local names known among Taiwan's indigenous peoples: tikulhat (Thao), tikulas (Bunun) and tikolac (Amis).

References

Taiwan bamboo partridge
Birds of Taiwan
Taiwan bamboo partridge